Leslie Roy Foote (20 August 1924 – 11 April 2006) was an Australian rules footballer in the Victorian Football League.

Football career
A local lad, and recruited from the North Melbourne Colts, Foote played his first match with the North Melbourne Football Club in 1941 at just 16 years of age.

He was able to kick equally well with both feet, and his ability to play close to the ground meant that he was not only a brilliant ball player, but was also had an outstanding ability to control the ball in packs. He was an excellent mark.

He was famous for his baulking and dodging skills (skills which he claimed to have honed "by walking through the crowded city footpaths, dodging and weaving through the oncoming people") and his courageous style of play.

He would torment his opponents by running straight towards them, holding the ball out to them — and, then, doing a blind turn around them, and continuing on his way.

His favourite ploy was, having taken a mark, to walk back and pretend to be preparing to do a drop kick, the man on the mark would jump into the air as Foote approached and, he would continue running towards the man on the mark, bounce the ball, and run straight past him, giving him the opportunity to deliver the ball much further up the ground.

Considered by many to be the most handsome footballer of his era, Foote had a propensity for ostentatiously displaying his extensive range of gracious football talents; and he was renowned for his habit of, regardless of where he had received the ball, running and bouncing the ball (often across the entire width of the Arden Street ground), so that he could run goalwards in full display along the boundary closest to the Ladies' Stand!

Sixth round 1947
Les Foote was responsible for one of the greatest comebacks ever seen in the last quarter of an AFL/VFL football match. In the sixth round of the home-and-home season (24 May 1947), playing at the Arden Street Oval against Essendon, North Melbourne was 44 points behind at three-quarter time: North 7.8 (50) v Essendon 14.10 (94).

Coming into the match, North Melbourne were on the bottom of the ladder and had lost the two preceding matches. In the fourth round (10 May 1947), North Melbourne had been thrashed by Fitzroy by 101 points, and did not kick a goal until the last quarter, while in the fifth round (17 May 1947), North Melbourne had been beaten by Footscray by 41 points after trailing all day.

Foote placed himself into the ruck at three quarter time. He dominated the ruck, and North Melbourne were so dominant during the last quarter that the ball was at Essendon's end of the ground only once, and North scored 8.4 (52) to Essendon's zero to win the match by 8 points: North 15.12 (102) d. Essendon 14.10 (94).

To put the magnitude of this astounding win into some sort of perspective, the team that North Melbourne thrashed in the last quarter of that match went on to play in the Grand Final that year, losing by a single point when Carlton's Fred Stafford goaled with 40 seconds left to play.

Further, to get some perspective of Foote's astonishing performance as a ruckman on that day, at 182 cm  he was dominating the three ruckmen Essendon had selected to play that day; namely, Ivan Goodingham (191 cm ), Perc Bushby (189 cm ), Bob McClure (188 cm ).

This record stood unbeaten for 45 years.

First Grand Final
Foote was the first man to captain North Melbourne into a VFL Grand Final in 1950, having played a career-best game against Geelong in the previous week's Preliminary Final, in which he almost single-handedly converted a seven-goal (42-point) deficit into a 17-point win for North Melbourne.

Essendon had already beaten North Melbourne in the Second Semi-Final 11.14 (80) to 11.11 (77) when, in driving rain, and with 30 seconds remaining, and with North Melbourne three points in front,  North Melbourne's Jock McCorkell unexpectedly punched a ball that was already rolling out over the boundary line back into play just before it crossed the line, Essendon's John Coleman pounced on the ball, and passed it to Ron McEwin in the goal square. McEwin kicked the goal, and Essendon won by three points.

North Melbourne's disappointment with such a narrow and unexpected loss was compounded by the fact that North Melbourne's champion full-forward Jock Spencer had earlier had what had seemed to be a legitimate spectacular aerial mark (i.e., a "speckie") disallowed in controversial circumstances.

Although Essendon had only lost one match during the season, many thought that North Melbourne, having lost such a close match two weeks before, and having played so well against Geelong, really had a good chance of winning the Grand Final against Essendon.

However, in an unexpectedly one-sided match, with a rain lashed third quarter, North Melbourne "went the knuckle", rather than playing football, and they specifically targeted the Essendon star players Dick Reynolds, Ron McEwin, Bill Snell, Bert Harper, Ted Leehane, and John Coleman. Essendon won the 1950  Grand Final 13.14 (92) to 7.12 (54) in front of a crowd of 87,601.

Coaching
Foote took up a captain-coach position with the Berrigan Football Club in New South Wales. He coached them for two years before returning to the VFL in 1954 as captain-coach St Kilda.

In 1954, having returned to the highest, toughest, and fastest level of Australian Rules football, and at the (in those days) advanced age of 30, Foote won St Kilda's best and fairest in front of the 1958 Brownlow Medalist Neil Roberts, the 8 times Victorian representative Keith Drinan, and 4 times Victorian representative and   1958 All-Australian player Jim Ross (the three won seven bests and fairests between them).

In 1976 he was non-playing coach of VFA Club Box Hill.

Awards
He won three best and fairest awards with North Melbourne (1945, 1949, and 1950).

He won the St Kilda best and fairest award in 1954.

Les Foote was inducted into the Australian Football Hall of Fame in 1996.

Footnotes

References

 Maplestone, M., Flying Higher: History of the Essendon Football Club 1872–1996, Essendon Football Club, (Melbourne), 1996. 
 Ross, J. (ed), 100 Years of Australian Football 1897–1996: The Complete Story of the AFL, All the Big Stories, All the Great Pictures, All the Champions, Every AFL Season Reported, Viking, (Ringwood), 1996. 
 Sheahan, M., "Foote a true North legend" (obituary), Herald Sun, (Melbourne), 13 April 2006.

External links
 

St Kilda Football Club coaches
Trevor Barker Award winners
1924 births
2006 deaths
St Kilda Football Club players
North Melbourne Football Club players
Preston Football Club (VFA) players
Syd Barker Medal winners
Box Hill Football Club coaches
Preston Football Club (VFA) coaches
Australian Football Hall of Fame inductees
Australian rules footballers from Victoria (Australia)